Hussain Al-Qahtani (born 20 December 1994) is a Saudi Arabian professional footballer who plays as a midfielder for Pro League side Al-Shabab.

Career
Al-Qahtani began his career at the youth team of Al-Hilal. He was the captain of the U23 team during his last season with the club. He joined Al-Faisaly's youth team on 22 August 2016. On 12 May 2017, Al-Qahtani signed his first professional contract with Al-Faisaly. He made his debut with Al-Faisaly on 7 April 2018 during the league match against Al-Batin. On 27 April 2018, Al-Qahtani helped Al-Faisaly's U23 team win their first-ever U23 league title. On 6 January 2020, Al-Qahtani signed a pre-contract agreement with Al-Shabab and joined the club following the conclusion of the 2019–20 season.

Career statistics

Club

References

External links 
 

1994 births
Living people
Sportspeople from Riyadh
Association football midfielders
Saudi Arabian footballers
Al Hilal SFC players
Al-Faisaly FC players
Al-Shabab FC (Riyadh) players
Saudi Professional League players
Saudi Arabia youth international footballers
Footballers at the 2014 Asian Games
Asian Games competitors for Saudi Arabia
21st-century Saudi Arabian people
20th-century Saudi Arabian people